Września County is a unit of territorial administration and local government (powiat) in Greater Poland Voivodeship, west-central Poland. It came into being on January 1, 1999, as a result of the Polish local government reforms passed in 1998. Its administrative seat and largest town is Września; the county is administered from the district office building there.

As of 2012 its total population is 76,453.

Neighbouring counties
Września County is bordered by Gniezno County to the north, Słupca County to the east, Pleszew County and Jarocin County to the south, and Środa Wielkopolska County and Poznań County to the west.

Administrative division
The county is subdivided into five gminas (four urban-rural and one rural). These are listed in the following table, in descending order of population.

External links
Official website

References

 
Land counties of Greater Poland Voivodeship